Bayville Farm, also known as Church Point Plantation and Bayside Plantation, was a historic plantation house located at Virginia Beach, Virginia.  The house was built in 1827 and enlarged in the 1840s, and was a two-story, five bay, two-story, double-pile, frame structure with brick ends.  It had a basement laid in three-course American bond.  It had pedimented tetra-style Roman Doric order porch at each entrance and four interior end chimneys.  It was destroyed by fire in 2007.

It was added to the National Register of Historic Places in 1980, and delisted in 2008.

References

Former National Register of Historic Places in Virginia
Plantation houses in Virginia
Houses on the National Register of Historic Places in Virginia
Houses completed in 1827
Houses in Virginia Beach, Virginia
National Register of Historic Places in Virginia Beach, Virginia
Burned houses in the United States
1827 establishments in Virginia